Martin Kližan is the defending champion, but decided to compete in the 2013 Internazionali BNL d'Italia instead.
Gaël Monfils defeated Michaël Llodra in the final 7–5, 7–6(7–5) to win the title.

Seeds

Draw

Finals

Top half

Bottom half

External Links
 Main Draw
 Qualifying Draw

BNP Paribas Primrose Bordeauxandnbsp;- Singles
2013 Singles